Mobile Telecommunications Company K.S.C.P. (doing business as Zain), is a Kuwaiti mobile telecommunications company founded in 1983 in Kuwait as MTC (Mobile Telecommunications Company), and later rebranded as Zain in 2007. Zain has a commercial presence in seven countries across the Middle East with 49.5 million active customers as of 31 December 2019. The Vice Chairman and Group CEO is Bader Nasser Al-Kharafi, who was appointed in March 2017. Approximately 24.6% of the company is owned by Kuwait Investment Authority; 21.9% is owned by Omantel; only shareholders that own above 5% are disclosed.

The Zain brand is one of the most recognized telecom brands across the MENA region, with a brand value in excess of US$2.3 billion.

Financial highlights
Zain is listed on the Kuwait Stock Exchange. There are no restrictions on Zain shares as the company's capital is 100% free float and publicly traded. The largest shareholder is the Kuwait Investment Authority (24.6%).

For the full-year 2019, Zain Group generated consolidated revenue of KD 1.66 billion (US$5.5 billion), an impressive 26% Y-o-Y growth, while consolidated EBITDA for the period rose by 40% Y-o-Y to reach KD 728 million (US$2.4 billion), reflecting a healthy EBITDA margin of 44%. Consolidated net income reached KD 217 million (US$715 million), up 10% and reflecting Earnings Per Share of 50 Fils (US$0.17).

Operations
Zain has presence in a number of countries.

Presence in Africa (2005–2010)
From 2005 to 2010, Zain maintained a presence in a number of countries in Sub-Saharan Africa, in addition to its core market in the MENA region.

Zain entered Africa in May 2005 through the $3.4 billion purchase of Celtel International which had 13 country operations in Africa, serving five million customers at that time. Zain invested heavily across the continent through network upgrades and acquiring two more country licences. By June 2010, Zain had over 40 million customers across the continent, operating in Burkina Faso, Chad, Democratic Republic of the Congo, Gabon, Ghana, Kenya, Madagascar, Malawi, Niger, Nigeria, Sierra Leone, Tanzania, Uganda and Zambia.

In early 2010, Zain accepted an offer for the sale of all its Africa operations. On 8 June 2010, Zain announced that it had satisfied all required conditions precedent to closing of the sale of 100% of Zain Africa BV to Bharti Airtel Limited for $10.7 billion on an enterprise basis.

Today, Zain operates on the African continent only in Sudan, South Sudan and Morocco.

See also 

 Celtel

References

External links
 

Telecommunications in South Sudan
Telecommunications companies established in 1983
Telecommunications companies of Kuwait
Telecommunications companies of Bahrain
Kuwaiti brands
Mobile phone companies of Kuwait
International organizations based in Kuwait
Companies based in Kuwait City
Kuwaiti companies established in 1983